Fábio Farroco Braga (born 6 September 1992) is a Portuguese footballer who plays as a defensive midfielder.

Club career
Born in Lisbon, Braga moved to Brazil in 1995, aged two. In 2009, he joined Fluminense's youth setup, after a stint at Internacional, and was promoted to the former's first team ahead of the 2012 campaign.

Braga made his senior debut on 21 January 2012, coming on as a late substitute for Alejandro Martinuccio in a 3–0 home win against Friburguense for the Campeonato Carioca championship. He scored his first goal on 28 April, netting the first in a 2–0 home success over Volta Redonda.

Braga made his Série A debut on 20 May, starting in a 1–0 win at Corinthians, and finished the season with eight league matches, as his side was crowned champions. In August 2013 he was linked to a move to Modena, but the deal later collapsed.

On 27 August 2014, after being rarely used, Braga was loaned to América-RN until December. He appeared in only four matches for the side, which eventually suffered relegation.

On 28 January 2015 Braga moved to CSM Studențesc Iași, signing a six-month contract after being released by Flu. He scored his first professional goal on 9 March, netting the last in a 2–0 away win against FC Petrolul Ploiești.

Braga returned to Brazil on 6 January 2016, signing for Coritiba Foot Ball Club. Unused as they finished runners-up in the Campeonato Paranaense, he made his debut on 4 June, replacing César González for the final 20 minutes of a 2–1 loss at national champions Sport Club Corinthians Paulista.

On 11 January 2017, Braga signed for Associação Atlética Ponte Preta for the year. He made one appearance as they came runners-up in the Campeonato Paulista, as a late substitute for Clayson in a 3–3 draw at Esporte Clube Santo André. On 25 July, having added just two more appearances in the national league, he was released from his contract, as was Lins.

Personal life
Braga's father, Abel, was also a footballer. A central defender, he also represented Fluminense. His younger brother João Pedro died in a fall from a balcony at their Rio de Janeiro home in July 2017, aged 19.

Career statistics
(Correct )

Honours
Fluminense
Campeonato Carioca: 2012
Série A: 2012

References

External links

1992 births
Living people
Footballers from Lisbon
Portuguese people of Brazilian descent
Portuguese footballers
Brazilian footballers
Association football midfielders
Campeonato Brasileiro Série A players
Fluminense FC players
Coritiba Foot Ball Club players
Liga I players
FC Politehnica Iași (2010) players
Portuguese expatriate footballers
Portuguese expatriate sportspeople in Romania
Brazilian expatriate sportspeople in Romania
Expatriate footballers in Romania